The 2011–12 Bosnia and Herzegovina Hockey League is the 4th season of the Bosnia and Herzegovina Hockey League (BHHL). It started on January 9, 2012.

League business
Prior to the start of the 2011–12 season it was announced that HK Bosna and left the league to play in the newly formed Open Championship of Bosnia and Herzegovina, an international league with teams from Bulgaria, Greece, and the Republic of Macedonia. HK Ilidža 2010 was renamed HK Ajkule Ilidža 2010 for the season and also changed their team logo. All games will again be played in Sarajevo at the Olympic Hall Zetra, now known as Olympic Hall Juan Antonio Samaranch.

Each team will play ten games for the season before the playoff. Following on from the previous season HK Alfa and HK Stari Grad will continue to play under their nicknames of HK Medvjedi and HK Vukovi respectively.

In February 2012 heavy snowfall caused the collapse of the roof that covered the rink leading to the season being indefinitely postponed. In November 2012 the season resumed after the ice rink was re-installed. Three games were played to complete the regular season before the top two ranked teams advanced to the finals playoff.

Regular season
The regular season consisted of each team playing 10 games.

Schedule

Playoffs
HK Ajkule Ilidža 2010 and HK Alfa qualified for the playoffs after finishing first and second in the regular season standings respectively. HK Ajkule Ilidža 2010 won the single game final 3–2 in a shootout.

References

External links
Official site 

Bosnia and Herzegovina Hockey League seasons
Bos
2011–12 in Bosnia and Herzegovina ice hockey